High Voltage is a 1997 direct-to-video action film directed by Isaac Florentine and starring Antonio Sabàto, Jr., Shannon Lee, Amy Smart, George Kee Cheung, Lochlyn Munro, James Lew, William Zabka and Antonio Sabato.

Plot
A group of close-knit thieves are led by Johnny (Antonio Sabàto, Jr), Mollie (Amy Smart), Larry (Lochlyn Munro) and Sam (Mike Mains). Their latest target is a small bank in Little Saigon, Orange Country, California. Mollie has been working in the bank undercover for months with the bank's manager Jane (Shannon Lee) unaware of what she plans to do. On the day of the robbery, Johnny and the rest of the gang burst in, forcing everyone on the floor. Johnny orders Jane to open the bank vault. As she opens it, Johnny discovers a large cache of money which is laundered by a Vietnamese mobster named Victor Phan (George Kee Cheung). Instead of taking the money, they escape empty-handed. Victor orders his men to go after the gang and Jane is revealed to be Victor's mistress who is imprisoned by him. She wants to leave Victor but knows he would never let her go. Johnny and his gang manage to survive an attack on them by Victor's men and join forces with Jane, who offers them Victor's money if they kill him. On the night Victor is meeting with drug dealers at his nightclub, Johnny and his gang burst in, leading to a shootout. They successfully steal his money and escape with Jane, but Victor survives the attack, forcing the group to go on the run with Victor and his men after them.

Cast
Antonio Sabàto Jr. as Johnny Clay
Shannon Lee as Jane Logan
Amy Smart as Molly
Lochlyn Munro as Larry
George Kee Cheung as Victor Phan
Mike Mains as Sam Hicks
William Zabka as Bulldog
James Lew as Harry
Antonio Sabàto as Carlo

Popular Culture 
In 2014, High Voltage was featured on an episode of Red Letter Media's "Best of the Worst" series along with Death Spa and Space Mutiny.

References

External links
High Voltage at the Internet Movie Database
https://www.filmaffinity.com/es/film482996.html

1997 films
1997 action films
American action films
Films directed by Isaac Florentine
Films set in Los Angeles
1990s English-language films
1990s American films